Daewonsa is a Buddhist temple of the Jogye Order in Gyeongsangnam-do, South Korea.

History 
Daewonsa Temple (Korean: 대원사, Chinese: 大源寺, Pronounced “Day-won-sa”) was established in 548 by Patriarch Ven. Yeongi.  Originally named Pyeongwonsa Temple, it was reduced to ashes during the Japanese invasion (1592–1597) but reconstructed in 1685 and renamed Daewonam Hermitage. It was again rebuilt in 1890 and renamed Daewonsa Temple. In 1948, during the Yeosun Rebellion, the temple was burned to the ground by government forces. In September 1955, Ven. Beobil, a Buddhist nun, took office as its head, and launched its reconstruction, eventually completing the temple we see today.

Landscape 
Nestled deep in an eastern fold of Mt. Jirisan, Daewonsa Temple is occupied by Buddhist nuns. Sarijeon Hall has a stone pagoda standing in front of it and it is where many nuns practice intensive Seon meditation during the annual three-month summer and winter retreats.

The temple is surrounded by great scenic beauty. A mountain stream runs through the  valley that extends from the parking lot at the temple entrance to the temple compound. The water rushing between and over the uniquely shaped rocks give it an uncommon charm. The path to the entrance is lined with tall, straight pines called “diamond pines.”

Cultural properties 
The Multi-Story Stone Pagoda (Treasure No. 1112)  enshrines the Buddha's relics which Vinaya Master Jajang Yulsa brought from China. During the Joseon era, the pagoda was repaired twice, in 1724 by Seon Master Taeheum, and in 1784 by Seon Master Ogin. It was then that 72 relics (sarira) were found. In the most recent renovation, the relics were divided and enshrined in the pagoda's 3rd, 5th and 7th stories.

Other cultural objects include: a Painting of Buddhist Guardian Deities (Tangible Cultural Heritage of South Gyeongsang Province No. 361) and Banja (suspended gong; Tangible Cultural Heritage of South Gyeongsang Province No. 362). In addition, the temple itself is designated Traditional Temple No. 81, and the valley is Regional Cultural Heritage No. 114.

Gallery

References

External links
 Daewonsa official website(in Korean)
 
 

Buddhist temples of the Jogye Order
Buddhist temples in South Korea